Aarhus Airport  is a civilian airport located  northeast of Aarhus, Denmark.

History
The airfield was established in 1943 by German occupying forces in World War II and was later used as a Cold War military base for the Danish and other allied airforces until the 1990s. The airport still contains a small military depot and plays host to occasional training exercises; the last NATO exercise was in 2007.

The current passenger terminal dates from 1981 with renovations performed between 2007 and 2009 and again in late 2016. Since 1946 the airport has carried civilian traffic and is the primary gateway for Aarhus, located 40 km from the city centre via the Djursland motorway. Since December 2016 the local authority of Aarhus Kommune is the major shareholder in the airport,

The airport carried  passengers in 2019.

In March 2021, a construction project was announced. The project is scheduled to be completed in 2022. It includes a new hotel and increases terminal floor area from 5000 m2 to 10000 m2. Three new gates will be built so the airport has seven in total.

Facilities

Airlines and destinations

The following airlines operate regular scheduled and charter flights at the airport:

Statistics

Ground transportation
There are three parking areas with over 1300 parking spaces.

An airport bus, service 925X, takes passengers from the airport to Aarhus railway station and back. The bus is scheduled to meet every flight. Bus route 212 between Ebeltoft (20min) and Randers (60 min) stops at the airport. As it is a public service it is not scheduled around the flight timetable. 6–7 buses operate daily to Randers and 6–7 to Ebeltoft.

See also
 List of the largest airports in the Nordic countries

References

VFR Flight Guide Denmark: Aarhus – EKAH

External links

 Aarhus Airport official site: Danish or English
 The history about Fliegerhorst Tirstrup
 
 

Airports in Denmark
Transport in Aarhus
Airports established in 1943
1943 establishments in Denmark
International airports in Denmark